Big Finish may refer to:

 Big Finish Productions, a British company that produces books and audio plays based on science fiction properties
 Big Finish Games, the production company behind the Tesla Effect: A Tex Murphy Adventure adventure game